Corilagin is an ellagitannin. Corilagin was first isolated in 1951 from Dividivi extract and from Caesalpinia coriaria, hence the name of the molecule. It can also be found in Alchornea glandulosa and in the leaves of Punica granatum (pomegranate). 

It is a weak carbonic anhydrase inhibitor.

Ellagic acid and corilagin inhibit TGF-β1–dependent EMT and has been shown to attenuate fibrogenesis in a mouse model.  Fibrosis is also indicated in many health conditions, including skin aging and MRSA susceptibility.

References 

Ellagitannins
Pomegranate ellagitannins